Hodges Knoll (‘Mogila Hodges’ \mo-'gi-la 'ho-dzhis\) is the mostly ice-covered hill extending 2.2 km in northeast–southwest direction, 1 km wide and rising to 2250 m on the southwest side of Vinson Massif in Sentinel Range, Ellsworth Mountains in Antarctica.  It surmounts upper Nimitz Glacier to the southwest and its tributaries Tulaczyk Glacier to the north and Zapol Glacier to the east.

The peak is named after the British artist William Hodges (1744-1797), a member of James Cook’s 1772-75 exploration voyage who, along with Joseph Gilbert, produced the first paintings from the Antarctic region.

Location
US mapping in 1961 and 1988.

Maps
 Vinson Massif.  Scale 1:250 000 topographic map.  Reston, Virginia: US Geological Survey, 1988.
 Antarctic Digital Database (ADD). Scale 1:250000 topographic map of Antarctica. Scientific Committee on Antarctic Research (SCAR). Since 1993, regularly updated.

References
 Hodges Knoll. SCAR Composite Gazetteer of Antarctica.
 Bulgarian Antarctic Gazetteer. Antarctic Place-names Commission. (details in Bulgarian, basic data in English)

External links
 Hodges Knoll. Copernix satellite image

Ellsworth Mountains
Bulgaria and the Antarctic
Hills of Ellsworth Land